First Love is the debut studio album by Dominican-American R&B singer Karina Pasian. The album was released on August 19, 2008. The album debuted on #57 on the Billboard 200.

The album includes the singles "16 @ War" and "Can't Find The Words".

Karina recorded over 70 songs for the album, including a collaboration with John Legend called "Promise" that didn't make the album. First Love sold 9,000 copies in its first week. On December 3, 2008, the album was nominated for a Grammy for Best Contemporary R&B Album. As of December 2008, the album has sold a total of 28,408 copies.

Track listing

Singles

"16 @ War" 

"16 @ War" is the first single released from the album First Love.

"Can't Find The Words" 

"Can't Find the Words" is the second single from First Love.

"First Love" 
Released: August 5, 2008 (U.S.)Genres: Pop, R&BLength: 3:36Label: Def JamWriters: Shawn Campbell; Gordon Chambers; Marshall J. Leathers; Marcus Grant

"First Love" is a promo single that was released to iTunes on August 5, 2008 to promote the album.

"Winner" 
Released: August 12, 2008 (U.S.)Genres: Contemporary R&B, Pop Length: 4:11Label: Def JamWriters: Rico Love; Carlos "Los Da Maestro" McKinney, Shehnaz Khan 
"Winner" is also a promo single released on August 12, 2008 to iTunes, just one week before the release of the album “First Love.”

References

External links
Official Site

2008 debut albums
Albums produced by Tricky Stewart
Karina Pasian albums
Albums produced by Oak Felder